"Radioactive" is a song by American rock band Kings of Leon, and was the first single released from their 2010 album Come Around Sundown.

The song, along with its accompanying music video, premiered on September 8 on the Kings' website. The following day, it received its official radio premiere on Australian radio, and debuted on US Alternative Radio on September 13. The song was released on US iTunes on September 14, and released at a later date in remaining countries.

The song was nominated for the 53rd Grammy Awards in two categories: Best Rock Performance by a Duo or Group with Vocals and Best Rock Song.
The song is used in the films I Am Number Four and Boyhood.

Music video
The music video was released on September 8, 2010 on the Kings of Leon's website. The video that was made in a sepia-tone refers to the band's southern origins. It shows the band at a barbecue with a Gospel children's choir. Drummer Nathan Followill said, "Gospel music was a big part of us growing up, so to be able to come back and revisit that part of our lives at this stage in our lives is a pretty special thing."

NME named Radioactive's music video the second worst music video ever, commenting, "The music industry gasped in disbelief as the Oklahoma boys leapt into a muddled mise-en-scene of questionable racial subtext."

Live performances
Kings of Leon performed the song on Saturday Night Live on October 23, 2010 and on Late Show with David Letterman on October 25, 2010. On November 25, 2010, the band gave a mini-concert in New York for The Today Show during which they performed a three-song set including "Radioactive". They also sang it on May 13, 2011 on VH1 Storytellers.

Track listings
Digital download
"Radioactive" - 3:27

UK 2-track CD single
"Radioactive" - 3:27
"Radioactive (Remix Featuring West Angeles Mass Choir)" - 3:33

Chart performance
"Radioactive" debuted and peaked at #37 on the Billboard Hot 100. It has since re-entered the chart at number 65 upon the release of the album.

Charts

Weekly charts

Year-end charts

Certifications

Personnel
 Caleb - lead and backing vocals, rhythm guitar
 Nathan - drums, percussion, backing vocals
 Matthew - lead guitar, backing vocals
 Jared - bass, percussion
 Jacquire King - percussion, backing vocals

See also
List of number-one alternative rock singles of 2010 (U.S.)

References

2010 singles
Kings of Leon songs
Songs written by Matthew Followill
Songs written by Jared Followill
Songs written by Nathan Followill
Songs written by Caleb Followill
Music videos directed by Sophie Muller
Song recordings produced by Jacquire King
2010 songs